Askizsky District (Khakas: , Asxıs aymağı) is an administrative and municipal district (raion), one of the eight in the Republic of Khakassia, Russia. It is located in the central and western parts of the republic. Its administrative center is the rural locality (a selo) of Askiz. Population:  The population of the administrative center accounts for 17.8% of the district's total population.

Demographics
As of the 2010 Census the ethnic breakdown of Askizsky District was the following:Khakasses: 50.45%
Russians: 43.68%Germans: 1.08%Others: 4.79%

References

Notes

Sources

Districts of Khakassia
